Kimi Omou: Shunkashūtō is the first concept album by Japanese singer and songwriter Mai Kuraki. It was released on October 10, 2018, via Northern Music.

The album is a concept album about the four seasons in Japan and was released in six versions, including four versions that represent each season: Spring, Summer, Autumn, and Winter. The album has spawned five singles, including the platinum-selling single "Togetsukyo (Kimi Omou)". Kuraki embarked on the meet and greet tour Mai Kuraki Shunkashūtō Kai and the concert tour Mai Kuraki Live Project 2018 "Red It Be": Kimi Omou Shunkashūtō in support of the album.

Promotion

Singles
"Togetsukyo (Kimi Omou)" was released as the lead single from the album on 12 April 2017. The song served as the theme song to the 2017 Japanese animated film Detective Conan: Crimson Love Letter. A gagaku-influenced J-pop song produced by her long-time collaborator Akihito Tokunaga, "Togetsukyo (Kimi Omou)" was both commercially and critically successful. The song debuted and peaked at number five on the Oricon Weekly Singles Chart, selling 29,846 physical copies in its first week. Next week, the song was released on digital format and peaked at number two on the Billboard Japan Hot 100. The song has sold over 76,000 physical copies and 250,000 digital copies and has been certificated Platinum by the Recording Industry Association of Japan. Consequently, the song became Kuraki's best-selling single since her 2004 single "Ashita e Kakeru Hashi". The song was also included on Kuraki's third compilation album Mai Kuraki x Meitantei Conan Collaboration Best 21: Shinjitsu wa Itsumo Uta ni Aru!.

As a first part of the weekly project of releasing a song every week on the three consecutive weeks, "We Are Happy Women" was released as the second single on 2 March 2018. The feminist-empowerment song served as the campaign song for Happy Woman, an official project for protecting Japanese women's human rights and managed to enter the Billboard Japan Top Download Songs chart,peaking at number ninety-three.

"Do It!" was released to several radio stations based in Nagoya with no announcements, and officially released as the third single on 9 March 2018. The uptempo rock song served as the official theme song for the annual marathon race for female runners, 2018 Nagoya Women's Marathon, and peaked at number seventy-four on the Billboard Japan Top Download Songs chart.

"Light Up My Life" was released on 16 March 2018, as the fourth single from the album and the last part of the weekly project. The song served as the theme song to the role-playing video game Valkyria Chronicles 4 and performed better commercial success than the last two singles, peaking at number fifty-nine on the Billboard Japan Top Download Songs chart.

"Koyoi wa Yume wo Misasete" was released on 8 August 2018, as the fifth single. The gagaku-influenced dance-pop song served as the theme song to the anime television series Tsukumogami Kashimasu. A short version of the official music video for the song featuring a Japanese voice actress, Mikako Komatsu, who is known as a big fan of Kuraki and provided the voice of Okō in the anime, was released on YouTube on 7 August 2018.

Other songs
"Hanakotoba" served as the commercial song to the television manufactured by Mitsubishi Electric, Real 4K, the campaign song of Kyoto city government, and the theme song to the Japanese music television program, Buzzrhythm 2. An official music video for the song is included on the DVD, which is accompanied with the limited edition of the album. The video was taken in 4K resolution and premiered through Kuraki's official YouTube account on 7 September 2018.

"Be Proud: We Make New History" served as the campaign song to celebrate the sixty anniversary of the corporation, Nihon Unisys, Ltd. Kuraki has been the official ambassador of the company since April 2016.

Tours

Mai Kuraki Shunkashūtō Kai
In support of the album, Kuraki embarked on the meet and greet tour entitled Mai Kuraki Shunkashūtō Kai, which began on 25 August 2018 in Toyoyama, Aichi and ended on 16 September 2018 in Funabashi, Chiba. At the tour, Kuraki sang several song and went on to hand her merchandise, braid ribbon to the audiences. Fans were also allowed to do high-fives with her and given photographs of Kuraki, some of which were autographed by her.

Mai Kuraki Live Project 2018 "Red It Be": Kimi Omou Shunkashūtō

The concert tour, entitled Mai Kuraki Live Project 2018 "Red It Be": Kimi Omou Shunkashūtō began on 13 October 2018 in Narita, Chiba and end on 11 November 2018 in Nagoya, Aichi to promote the album. All of the shows were recorded and released on a concert DVD/Blu-ray, Mai Kuraki Live Project 2018 "Red It be: Kimi Omou Shunkashūtō".

Set list
The following set list is representative of the show in Chiba on October 13, 2018. It is not representative of all concerts for the duration of the tour.

"Togetsukyo (Kimi Omou)"
"Koyoi wa Yume wo Misasete"
"Yume ga Saku Haru"
"P.S My Sunshine"
"Reach for the Sky"
"Secret of My Heart"
"Mi Corazón"
"Light Up My Life"
"Don't Know Why" 
"Be Proud: We Make New History"
"Makka na Kasa: Kyōto no Ame"
"Time After Time (Hana Mau Machi de)"
"Hanakotoba"
"We Are Happy Women"
"Be with U"
"Stand Up"
"Sawage Life"
"Wake Me Up"
"Do It!"
Encore
"Muteki na Heart"
"Love, Day After Tomorrow"
"Always"

Commercial performance
Kimi Omou: Shunkashūtō debuted at number two on the Oricon Daily Albums chart, with the sales of 10,143 physical copies. The album sold 20,551 copies in its first week and reached number three on the Oricon Weekly Albums chart.

Track listing

Personnel

Mai Kuraki – vocals, backing vocals, producer
Koichiro Muroya - violin 
Takayuki Yoshimura - piano 
Naoki Kobayashi - bass 
Aika Ohno - backing vocals 
Akihito Tokunaga - backing vocals, electric guitar, synths 
Shun Sato - director
Tokiko T Nishimuro - chief director
Takayuki Ichikawa - mixer, recording engineer
Takeshi Takizawa - mixer
Hidemi Arai - art designer
Tetsuo Sato - art director, designer
Sunao Ohmori - photographer
Hitoko Goto - stylist
Keizo Kuroda - hair and makeup artist
Kaoru Chujo - visual director
Asumi Narita - creative coordinator
Miho Saito - A&R
Asako Watanabe - artist manager
Manami Yoshita - artist manager
Toshinori Masuda - supervisor
Kanonji – executive producer

Charts

Daily charts

Weekly charts

Monthly charts

Release history

References

2018 albums
Concept albums
Mai Kuraki albums
Being Inc. albums
Japanese-language albums
Albums produced by Daiko Nagato